Batts is an English surname, derived from a diminutive of Bartholomew. Notable people with the surname include:

Anthony Batts (born 1960), American police chief
Deborah Batts (1947-2010), American lawyer and judge
Elizabeth Batts (1742–1835), British wife of James Cook
Lloyd Batts (born 1951), American basketball player
Matt Batts (1921–2013), American baseball player
Nathaniel Batts (1620–1679), American trader and explorer
R. L. Batts (1864–1935), American judge
Thomas Batts (16th century), English settler and explorer

See also
Stephen Batts (born 1946), hospital and healthcare international adviser.
Mikey Batts (born 1983), ring name of American wrestler Michael Altieri
Batts are also a building insulation product. See Building insulation materials#Fiberglass batts and blankets (Glass wool)
Bat
Batt (disambiguation)
Also short for Battery

English-language surnames
Patronymic surnames